Redcoat Air Cargo was a British cargo airline between 1976 and 1982 with headquarters at Horley in Sussex and an operating base at Luton Airport.

History
The company started operations in 1976 using a Bristol Britannia leased from Geminair. It used the aircraft to operate cargo flights from the United Kingdom to West Africa. It later bought its own Britannias, several being ex Royal Air Force Transport Command aircraft (including at least one previously operated by Air Faisal), and by 1979 was also operating freight charters for the Ministry of Defence.

The crash of the Britannia in 1980 led to the purchase of a Canadair CL-44 from British Cargo Airlines. Delay in acquiring the aircraft from the official receiver and subsequent engine problems led to cash flow issues and in 1982 the company entered voluntary liquidation.

Fleet

 Bristol Britannia
 Canadair CL-44

Media
In 1980 one of the company's Britannia aircraft was used in a BBC television drama series Buccaneer about a cargo airline.

Accidents and incidents
On 16 February 1980 a Bristol Britannia C Mk.1, registered G-BRAC, crashed after departure from Boston-Logan due to ice and snow on the aircraft; seven of the eight occupants died, including the spouse of a serving airman at RAF Belize.

See also
 List of defunct airlines of the United Kingdom

References
Notes

Bibliography

External links 

 Remembering the Billerica plane crash of 1980

Defunct airlines of the United Kingdom
Airlines established in 1976
Airlines disestablished in 1982
Aviation in England
Transport in Bedfordshire
1976 establishments in England
British companies established in 1976
1982 disestablishments in England
British companies disestablished in 1982